Blue Pool may refer to:

Blue Pool, Dorset
Tamolitch Blue Pool, Oregon
Blue Pool Bay, Wales
Blue Pool, Bermagui, New South Wales